Pod Children's Charity (registered as Pod Charitable Trust no: 279743) is a British non-profit organisation, which provides live entertainment for children in hospital and hospices throughout the UK.

History and overview 

Pod Children's Charity was founded in 1977 by David Jamilly, after he organized small parties with music and entertainment for children and noticed a positive effect which those have on them. Pod Charity started their shows at Great Ormond Street Hospital, one of the London's largest children's hospitals. At that time, hospitals were rarely child oriented and had restricted visiting times.

In 1981 Margaret Munford  became administrator for Pod and was awarded an MBE in 2012 for services to Pod Children's Charity.

Pod employs professional children's entertainers, such as puppeteers, clowns and musicians, who perform in the playroom, on the ward or at the bedside. Pod organises over 2500 performances at over 150 hospitals and hospices across the UK.

Aim 

Pod aims to alleviate the trauma of hospital stay by sowing the seeds of fun, laughter and feeling better.

The League of Friends of Pod Charitable Trust 

The League of Friends of The POD Charitable Trust (Charity no: 296119) is an entirely separate organisation, which covers all of Pod Charitable Trust’s administrative costs. Any donations to Pod Children's Charity go directly to entertaining children in hospital.

See also 

Play Therapy

References

External links 
 Official Website

Children's charities based in England
Health charities in the United Kingdom
1977 establishments in the United Kingdom